The 2010 Okayama GT 300km was the second round of the 2010 Super GT season. It took place at Okayama International Circuit on April 4, 2010.

Race 

Okayama GT 300km